St Cyngar's Church is a church in the town of Llangefni in Anglesey, Wales. The building dates from 1824. It was designated a Grade II listed building on 8 July 1952.

References

External links
 

Grade II listed churches in Anglesey
Llangefni
Llangefni
Churches completed in 1824